Cuong Vu (born 19 September 1969) is a Vietnamese-American jazz trumpeter. In addition to his own work as a bandleader, Vu was a member of the Pat Metheny Group. He is the first American person of Vietnamese descent to win a Grammy Award.  He won twice for Best Contemporary Jazz Album through his work with the band. He is currently associate professor and chair of jazz studies at the University of Washington.

Biography
Born in Saigon on September 19, 1969, Vu immigrated to Seattle with his family when he was six. At 11 he began to play the trumpet. He received a scholarship from the New England Conservatory of Music.

After graduating Vu moved to New York City in 1994, and formed the group Ragged Jack with Jamie Saft, Andrew D'Angelo, and Jim Black. Vu has worked with Laurie Anderson, David Bowie, Dave Douglas, Myra Melford, Gerry Hemingway, and Mitchell Froom.

While a member of the Pat Metheny Group, Vu won two Grammy Awards for Best Contemporary Jazz Album: Speaking of Now, The Way Up; and one nomination for Best Pop Instrumental Performance for the album As It Is. He worked with Metheny mainly as a trumpeter, but also contributed vocals, guitar and various small percussion. 

Vu's trio consists of bassist Stomu Takeishi and drummer Ted Poor.

Vu serves as chair and professor in the jazz studies department of the University of Washington's School of Music.

Discography

As leader
 Ragged Jack (Avant, 1997)
 Bound (Omnitone, 2000)
 Pure (Knitting Factory, 2000)
 Come Play with Me (Knitting Factory, 2001)
 It's Mostly Residual (ArtistShare/EMI, 2005)
 Vu-Tet (ArtistShare, 2007)
 Leaps of Faith (Origin, 2011)
 Holy Abyss (Cuneiform / E1, 2012) 
 Cuong Vu Trio Meets Pat Metheny (Nonesuch, 2016)
 Ballet (The Music of Michael Gibbs) (RareNoiseRecords, 2017)
 Change In The Air (RareNoiseRecords, 2018)

As sideman
 1993 – While You Were Out – Orange Then Blue
 1996 – Too Close to the Pole – Bobby Previte
 1997 – Sanctuary – Dave Douglas
 1997 – Interpretations of Lessness – Andy Laster
 1997 – Other Pocket – Jeff Song
 1997 – Rules of Engagement – Jeff Song
 1997 – Yeah/No – Chris Speed
 1999 – Chamber Works – Gerry Hemingway
 1999 – Deviantics – Chris Speed
 1999 – Hold the Elevator: Live in Europe & Other Haunts – Orange Then Blue
 2000 – Emit – Chris Speed
 2000 – Luciano's Dream – Oscar Noriega
 2000 – The Hollow World – Assif Tsahar & the Brass Reeds Ensemble
 2001 – "Your Turn to Drive" – David Bowie (single)
 2001 – Life on a String – Laurie Anderson
 2002 – Speaking of Now – Pat Metheny Group
 2002 – Window Silver Bright – Andy Laster
 2003 – Speaking of Now (DVD) – Pat Metheny Group
 2004 – Transition Sonic – Matthias Lupri
 2004 – Where the Two Worlds Touch – Myra Melford
 2005 – The Way Up – Pat Metheny Group
 2005 – Swell Henry – Chris Speed
 2006 – Grill Music – Jesper Løvdal
 2006 – The Image of Your Body – Myra Melford
 2006 – The Way Up (DVD) – Pat Metheny Group
 2008 – Coziness Kills – Jesper Løvdal
 2008 – Incendio – Los Dorados
 2009 – The Whole Tree Gone – Myra Melford
 2010 – Closer – Wasabi Trio meet Cuong Vu
 2010 – Gagarin – Mickey Finn + Cuong Vu
 2010 – Speak
 2014 – Alastor: Book of Angels Volume 21 – Eyvind Kang
 2019 – Overseas – Nguyên Lê

Awards

See also 
 Asian Americans in arts and entertainment
 List of Grammy Award winners and nominees by country

References

External links
Cuong Vu official site
audio sample
Interview

Review of Naked Truth album Vu is on
Cuong Vu at Dutch television show 'Vrije Geluiden' with Bob van Luijt and Yonga Sun
Cuong Vu Interview by breakthruradio.com

1969 births
Living people
People from Ho Chi Minh City
People from Seattle
Jazz fusion musicians
Avant-garde jazz musicians
American jazz trumpeters
Vietnamese jazz trumpeters
American musicians of Vietnamese descent
American people of Vietnamese descent
Vietnamese emigrants to the United States
Pat Metheny Group members
21st-century trumpeters
Orange Then Blue members
20th-century trumpeters
20th-century American musicians
20th-century American male musicians
21st-century American musicians
21st-century American male musicians
Knitting Factory Records artists
Cuneiform Records artists
Nonesuch Records artists
Origin Records artists
RareNoiseRecords artists
Jazz musicians from Washington (state)
ArtistShare artists